Bloomberg Philanthropies is a philanthropic organization that encompasses all of the charitable giving of founder Michael R. Bloomberg. Headquartered in New York City, Bloomberg Philanthropies focuses its resources on five areas: the environment, public health, the arts, government innovation and education. According to the Foundation Center, Bloomberg Philanthropies was the 10th largest foundation in the United States in 2015, the last year for which data was available. Bloomberg has pledged to donate the majority of his wealth, currently estimated at more than $54 billion. Patti Harris is the CEO of Bloomberg Philanthropies.

History
While working at Bloomberg L.P., Bloomberg donated much of his wealth to medical research, education and the arts. He also sat on the boards of numerous charitable organizations. Beginning in 2004, Bloomberg appeared on Chronicle of Philanthropy’s list of top 50 Americans who had donated the most money that year. Between 2004 and 2011, Bloomberg was listed as a top 10 American philanthropist each year.

Since 2006, the headquarters has been located at Stuyvesant Fish House  on East 78th Street in Manhattan.

Initiatives
Bloomberg Philanthropies directs its resources to five issue areas: the environment, public health, the arts, government innovation and education.

Environment
Bloomberg Philanthropies has focused on combating climate change and moving toward clean energy sources. In 2011, the foundation partnered with the Sierra Club’s Beyond Coal campaign by donating $50 million toward shutting down coal-fired power plants. On April 8, 2015, Bloomberg Philanthropies increased its support of the Beyond Coal campaign with a $30 million pledge, in order to accelerate the goal of closing and replacing half of all U.S. coal power plants with clean energy by 2017. Beyond Coal expanded into Europe in summer 2017 with a goal of phasing out the use of coal on the continent by 2030. The campaign marked the closure of the last coal-burning power plant in Austria in 2020. 2020 also saw the expansion of Beyond Coal into Asia including the launch in of Korea Beyond Coal in September of that year. Building on the momentum of the Beyond Coal work, Bloomberg Philanthropies launched Beyond Carbon, taking aim at natural gas and combustion-driven cars.

Bloomberg Philanthropies partnered with RadicalMedia to produce the 2017 documentary "From the Ashes." the film was distributed by National Geographic and debuted at the 2017 Tribeca Film Festival. The film appeared in theaters and aired on National Geographic in summer 2017. In conjunction with the film, Bloomberg Philanthropies announced a new commitment and crowdfunding campaign to support "entities backing economic development in communities that are historically dependent on the coal industry, and have suffered as plants have closed." In 2018, Bloomberg Philanthropies again partnered with National Geographic and Radical Media for a follow-up documentary, “From Paris to Pittsburgh.” The film examined the social and economic impacts of climate change-fueled natural disasters, from the heartland to the nation's coastlines.

Bloomberg Philanthropies also partners with the C40 Cities Climate Leadership Group, where Bloomberg is the former chairman, to curb carbon emissions in major cities around the world. In 2012, Bloomberg Philanthropies made a $6 million donation to the Environmental Defense Fund to help secure strong state-level regulations for hydraulic fracturing. Bloomberg has stated his support for "responsible" fracking as an alternative to coal power.  In January 2014, Bloomberg Philanthropies committed $53 million to Vibrant Oceans Initiative over the course of five years to help reform fisheries and increase sustainable populations. In April 2014, Bloomberg Philanthropies invested $5 million in Little Sun, a solar-powered lamp company founded by artist Olafur Eliasson and entrepreneur Frederik Ottesen.

In June 2017, after President Donald Trump announced plans to pull the United States out of the Paris climate agreement, Bloomberg Philanthropies Founder Mike Bloomberg unveiled plans to honor the nation's commitment through a network of governors, mayors and businesses. The alliance, known as America's Pledge was coordinated by Bloomberg Philanthropies. In cooperation with the Rocky Mountain Institute and the World Resources Institute, America's Pledge monitored climate activity and issued a series of reports in keeping with the climate accord's data requirements. When President Joe Biden took office in 2021 and announced plans to rejoin the climate agreement, America's Pledge and another Bloomberg Philanthropies led climate initiative called We Are Still In joined forces to become America is All In.

In 2018, Bloomberg Philanthropies and OceanX, an initiative of the Dalio family, committed $185 million over a period of four years to protect the oceans.

In May 2019, Bloomberg Philanthropies announced a 2020 Midwestern Collegiate Climate Summit in Washington University in St. Louis with the aim to bring together leaders from Midwestern universities, local government and the private sector to reduce climate impacts in the region.

In October 2020, Bloomberg Philanthropies was announced as one of the alliance partners of Prince William's Earthshot Prize, to find solutions to environmental issues.

In May 2022, Bloomberg Philanthropies announced a $242 million expansion into its efforts to help the world transition to clean energy. The announcement, made during the Sustainable Energy for All forum in Kigali, Rwanda, announced the investment will expand current energy transition efforts to 10 countries. These include Bangladesh, Brazil, Colombia, Kenya, Mozambique, Nigeria, Pakistan, South Africa, Turkey, and Vietnam. The initiative will focus on delivering data and research to governments and decision makers to aid and accelerate renewable investments; developing public awareness; working with countries to implement transition policies through international collaboration; launching clean energy pilot projects; and exploring strategies to phase out coal use. Key partners include Sustainable Energy for All and ClimateWorks Foundation.

Public health
Led by epidemiologist Kelly J. Henning, the Bloomberg Philanthropies public health program has focused on reducing tobacco use through the MPOWER tobacco control strategy, making roads safer and eradicating polio, among other public health initiatives. In March 2012, the foundation donated $220 million to fight tobacco use over a four-year period. Following new commitments in December 2016, Bloomberg Philanthropies reached a total of $1 billion in its campaign to reduce tobacco use, especially in low- and middle-income countries. In 2009, Bloomberg Philanthropies partnered with the World Health Organization to donate $125 million to reduce traffic-related fatalities, and in 2014, it committed an additional $125 million to combat road traffic deaths in low- and middle-income cities. In March 2013, Bloomberg Philanthropies donated $100 million to help the Bill and Melinda Gates Foundation eradicate polio worldwide.

Bloomberg Philanthropies has also supported initiatives to improve women's health. In July 2012, the foundation committed $50 million to the Global Family Planning Initiative, a Bill and Melinda Gates Foundation program focused on providing obstetric care and contraceptives to women in developing countries. This contribution came after Bloomberg pledged $250,000 to support Planned Parenthood in February 2012. In October 2012, the foundation also donated $8 million to the Bloomberg Philanthropies Maternal Health Program, which focuses on reducing maternal deaths in Tanzania. In March 2014, Bloomberg Philanthropies expanded its work in Tanzania and to provide reproductive health services in Africa and Latin America.

Beginning in 2012, Bloomberg Philanthropies pledged $16.5 million toward the Obesity Prevention Program, a three-year effort to support public health policies aimed at reducing obesity in Mexico, which has one of the highest rates of obesity in the world. With support from Bloomberg Philanthropies, Mexican health leaders and activists mounted a national health campaign against soda consumption and successfully lobbied for the passage of a national sugar-sweetened beverage tax. In 2014 - the first year of the tax - purchases of sugary drinks in Mexico dropped by up to 12%.

In January 2014, the Obesity Prevention Program and other health advocates in Mexico successfully lobbied for the passage of an 8% tax on high calorie snacks, which was intended to work in tandem with the 2014 soda tax to reduce unhealthy food purchases nationwide.  In June 2015, a study by researchers at Mexico's National Institute of Public Health and the University of North Carolina, Chapel Hill showed a corresponding average reduction of 5.1% in purchases of all food items subject to the junk food tax. Following the tax's implementation, lower-income households in Mexico purchased 10.2% less junk food, while medium-income households bought 5.8% less overall.

On March 23, 2015, Bloomberg Philanthropies launched the four-year, $100 million Data for Health initiative in partnership with the Australian government. The initiative's stated goal is to help 20 low and middle-income countries improve public health data collection and more effectively address public health problems. On June 21, 2016, Bloomberg Philanthropies announced the official launch of health partnerships with the first 18 participant countries, which include China, India, Sri Lanka, Myanmar, Bangladesh, Indonesia, the Philippines, Brazil, Ecuador, Malawi, Morocco, Papua New Guinea, Peru, Rwanda, Solomon Islands, Tanzania, and Zambia.

In 2019, Bloomberg Philanthropies launched a program to help prevent drowning in Bangladesh where they are the leading cause of death for children. The project focuses on providing childcare and other monitoring solutions to keep children out of harm's way. In 2020, Bloomberg Philanthropies announced it would double its ongoing effort to fight road traffic deaths worldwide with $240 million in additional funds through 2025 focusing on speed management and enforcement, infrastructure design and vehicle safety.

Arts
Bloomberg Philanthropies’ focus on the arts includes a $32 million commitment in 2011 to funding arts organizations and initiatives throughout New York City as well as provide business management training. Bloomberg Philanthropies invited 250 small and midsize arts organizations to apply for the $32 million disbursal. In September 2011, Bloomberg Philanthropies joined several foundations to contribute a total of $11.5 million to ArtPlace, a nationwide art funding initiative led by the National Endowment for the Arts that aims to use the arts as a strategy for economic development.

In June 2013, Bloomberg Philanthropies announced a $15 million grant to five institutions — Art Institute of Chicago, the Metropolitan Museum of Art, the Museum of Modern Art, the New York Botanical Garden, and Guggenheim Museum — as part of the Bloomberg Arts Engagement Initiative to develop mobile applications for visitors. In September 2014, Bloomberg Philanthropies committed $17 million to increase the use of digital technology at six cultural institutions – The Brooklyn Museum, American Museum of Natural History, Cooper Hewitt, Smithsonian Design Museum, San Francisco Museum of Modern Art, the Science Museum in London, and Gardens by the Bay in Singapore – and rebranded the program as Bloomberg Connects. The foundation has committed a total of $83 million to cultural institutions around the world.

In October 2014, Bloomberg Philanthropies launched the Public Art Challenge, a competition that invited local leaders and arts organizations to collaborate on temporary public art projects that would celebrate creativity and drive economic development. On June 23, 2015, Bloomberg Philanthropies announced four winning projects, selected from 237 nationwide submissions. The winning proposals came from Gary, Indiana; Los Angeles, CA; Spartanburg, SC; and a joint effort between Albany, Schenectady, and Troy, NY. Each winning proposal received $1 million to support the proposed public art installation over the following two years. In 2018, Bloomberg Philanthropies unveiled a new round of the Public Art Challenge and in January 2019 announced five winners: Anchorage, AK, Camden, NJ, Coral Springs, FL, Jackson, MS, and Tulsa, OK.

From July 16 to August 14, 2016, the Los Angeles Department of Cultural Affairs hosted Current: LA Water, a citywide public art biennial supported by a $1 million grant from Bloomberg Philanthropies’ Public Art Challenge initiative. Local artists created public art pieces across 16 different locations to remind LA residents of the city's important relationship with water, in the face of record-setting drought and the ongoing work to revitalize the Los Angeles River.

Speaking to the United States Conference of Mayors in May 2017, Bloomberg Philanthropies founder Michael Bloomberg announced the creation of the Partnership for Health Cities initiative which offers cities technical support to improve the health of residents. By July, fifty cities were participating in the program.

To support arts and other nonprofit organizations impacted by the COVID-19 pandemic, Bloomberg Philanthropies led a group of foundations in creating a $75 Response and Impact fund in March 2020. Foundations associated with Estée Lauder, Ken Griffin and Jon Stryker also contributed.

Government innovation
Bloomberg Philanthropies supports efforts to make city government more efficient and innovative. In January 2013, a $16.2 million grant was awarded to five different cities to establish Financial Empowerment Centers, which were set up to provide free financial counseling for low-income individuals. Five U.S. cities split a $24 million Bloomberg Philanthropies grant to create “Innovation Delivery Teams” – teams working to streamline municipal government. In August 2014, Bloomberg Philanthropies invested $45 million for grants to implement Innovation Delivery Teams in city governments across the United States.

In March 2013, Bloomberg Philanthropies announced Providence, R.I. as the winner of the Mayors Challenge, an initiative intended to foster innovation in America's cities. Providence was awarded $5 million for proposing a plan to overcome a language skills deficit prominent in low-income children. Houston, Philadelphia, Chicago, and Santa Monica each were awarded $1 million. In September 2014, Barcelona was announced as the winner of the European Mayors Challenge, and the city was awarded €5 million to help improve the quality of life for elderly residents. Athens, Kirklees, United Kingdom, Stockholm, and Warsaw were awarded €1 million each.

On January 20, 2016, Bloomberg Philanthropies launched the 2016 Mayors Challenge, calling for Latin American and Caribbean cities to submit government innovation proposals that improve residents’ lives and make government work better. In November, Mike Bloomberg announced that São Paulo, Brazil had won the $5 million grand prize for a project that helped farmers connect to urban markets. Four other cities received $1 million each in the challenge: Medellín and Bogotá in Colombia, as well as Santiago, Chile and Guadalajara, Mexico. Almost a third of the major cities in the region competed in the 2016 Mayors Challenge.

The next round of the innovation contest — focusing on American cities — was announced in June 2017. The next round of the innovation contest — focusing on American cities — was announced in June 2017. In fall 2018, nine cities were announced as the winners: Denver, CO; Durham, NC; Fort Collins, CO; Georgetown, TX; Huntington, WV; Los Angeles; New Rochelle, NY; Philadelphia; and South Bend, IN. The winning projects addressed a range of subjects including homelessness, climate change and the opioid crisis.

In April 2015, Bloomberg Philanthropies launched What Works Cities, a $42 million national initiative to help 100 mid-sized American cities better use data and evidence to improve government effectiveness and residents' lives. As of March 2016, 27 U.S. cities were official participants in the program.

In 2016, Bloomberg gave Harvard $32 million to create the Bloomberg Harvard City Leadership Initiative within Harvard Kennedy School's Ash Center for Democratic Governance and Innovation; the initiative provides training to mayors and their aides on innovative municipal leadership and challenges facing cities.

In March 2021, Bloomberg Philanthropies donated $150 million to Harvard University to create the Bloomberg Center for Cities to support mayors.

In May 2022, Bloomberg announced the launch of a $50 million national program to ensure that all cities and towns have access federal infrastructure funding, to drive local recovery and aid in improving communities for residents. the Local Infrastructure Hub: Support for U.S. Cities and Towns to Put Federal Funding to Work for Residents, aims to connect city leaders to experts to develop clarity and direction in the application process for federal infrastructure. This is aimed to be done by understanding the 400 funding opportunities offered by the government and developing competitive funding applications.

Education
Bloomberg Philanthropies focuses on driving public policy initiatives and education leadership at a local level as a means to improving America's school system. To date, the organization's education giving has been split between charitable, legislative and political initiatives. In October 2014, Bloomberg Philanthropies launched a $10 million program to help top-performing students from low- and middle-income families apply to and graduate from the nation's top colleges. By December 2016, it pledged to give $1.7 million to the American Talent Initiative, a program run by the College Excellence Program at the Aspen Institute and Ithaka S+R, a consulting subsidiary of Ithaka Harbors.

In April 2022, Bloomberg Philanthropies announced three grants totalling $200 million in support of public charter schools. The receipts were Harlem Children's Zone's, Promise Academy and Success Academy.

Other philanthropic ventures
Bloomberg has been a longtime donor to his alma mater, Johns Hopkins University. In January 2013, he donated $350 million to the university, the largest single gift in the school's history. In total, Bloomberg has donated $1.1 billion to Johns Hopkins, making him the most generous living donor to any education institution in the country.

In April 2001, the School of Hygiene and Public Health was renamed as the Johns Hopkins Bloomberg School of Public Health. In May 2012, the Charlotte R. Bloomberg Children's Center opened inside the new Johns Hopkins Hospital, with a focus on pediatric care.

Bloomberg Global Business Forum
The Bloomberg Global Business Forum is an annual event organized by Bloomberg Philanthropies. The event is held during the annual meeting of the United Nations General Assembly in each September in New York City as part of Global Goals Week - an annual week-long event for action, awareness, and accountability for the Sustainable Development Goals.

Women's economic development
Since 2008 Bloomberg Philanthropies has worked with nonprofit advocacy organizations including Women for Women International and Sustainable Harvest to create economic opportunities for women in Sub-Saharan Africa. Supported initiatives include job training, civic and life skills education, entrepreneurship programs, and a philanthropic data-sharing portal created with the Foundation Center and the King Baudouin Center to help women in Rwanda, Democratic Republic of the Congo, Burundi, Sudan, and Nigeria.

While hosting the U.S.-Africa Business Forum on September 23, 2016, Bloomberg Philanthropies announced a $10 million grant to the Relationship Coffee Institute to support the expansion of its ongoing women's economic development initiatives in Rwanda and Democratic Republic of Congo. The renewed financial commitment will enable the institute to provide an additional 20,000 women in both countries with business training and connections to international coffee markets.

On October 4, 2016, Marriott International opened its first hotel in Rwanda with a pledge to support women trained by the Relationship Coffee Institute and Women for Women International - both local partners of Bloomberg Philanthropies. The new hotel has employed 27 such trainees in hospitality positions and procured their artisanal baskets, coffee, cheese, and honey to provide to hotel guests.

Sciences
On October 18, 2016, Bloomberg revealed it is donating $50 million to the Museum of Science in Boston, the largest gift in the institution's 186-year history.

Board of directors
As of March 2023:

 Tenley Albright, former Olympic figure skating champion, Director of MIT Collaborative Initiatives, Massachusetts Institute of Technology
 Emma Bloomberg, daughter of Michael Bloomberg
 Georgina Bloomberg, daughter of Michael Bloomberg
 Geoffrey Canada, President and founder, Harlem Children's Zone
 Mark Carney, former Governor of the Bank of England
 Kenneth Chenault, Managing Director and Chairman of General Catalyst
 Manny Diaz, former Mayor of Miami
 Daniel L. Doctoroff, founder and chairman of Target ALS, former CEO and President of Bloomberg L.P.
 Patti Harris, CEO of Bloomberg Philanthropies
 Mellody Hobson, Co-CEO and president of Ariel Investments
 Robert A. Iger, CEO, The Walt Disney Company
 Walter Isaacson, author and professor at Tulane University
 Maya Lin, artist
 John J. Mack, Chairman emeritus of Morgan Stanley
 Reverend Joseph M. McShane, President emeritus of Fordham University
 Mike Mullen, former Chairman of the Joint Chiefs of Staff
 Jamie Niven, Retired Chairman, Sotheby's The Americas
 Sam Nunn, Co-chair of the Nuclear Threat Initiative and former U.S. Senator
 Samuel J. Palmisano, Chairman, the Center for Global Enterprise, former president, CEO and chairman of IBM
 Henry Paulson, former U.S. Secretary of the Treasury
 Ruth Porat, Senior vice president and chief financial officer, Alphabet and Google
 Alfred Sommer, Professor and Dean emeritus at the Johns Hopkins Bloomberg School of Public Health
 Sir Martin Sorrell, Chief Executive of S4 Capital
 Anne Tatlock, former chairman and CEO of Fiduciary Trust International
Dennis Walcott, President and CEO of Queens Library, former New York City Schools Chancellor

References

External links
 
 

Michael Bloomberg
Philanthropies
Philanthropy in the United States